Matthew Boyles (born September 15, 1982) is an American race walker. He attended the University of Rio Grande and competed at the 2007 Pan American Games.

Achievements

References

Profile

1982 births
American male racewalkers
Athletes (track and field) at the 2007 Pan American Games
Living people
Sportspeople from Parkersburg, West Virginia
University of Rio Grande alumni
Track and field athletes from West Virginia
People from Cedarville, Ohio
Pan American Games track and field athletes for the United States